Fashchivka is a village in Ternopil Raion (district) in Ternopil Oblast of western Ukraine. It belongs to Pidvolochysk settlement hromada, one of the hromadas of Ukraine.

Until 18 July 2020, Fashchivka was located in Pidvolochysk Raion. The raion was abolished in July 2020 as part of the administrative reform of Ukraine, which reduced the number of raions of Ternopil Oblast to three. The area of Pidvolochysk Raion was merged into Ternopil Raion.

References

Villages in Ternopil Raion